Hajji Kola (also Romanized as Ḩājjī Kolā) is a village in Mianrud Rural District, Chamestan District, Nur County, Mazandaran Province, Iran. At the 2006 census, its population was 171, in 45 families.

References 

Populated places in Nur County